Victoria Eugenia Méndez Márquez (born 26 March 1961) is a Mexican politician affiliated with the Institutional Revolutionary Party. As of 2014 she served as Senator of the LIX Legislature of the Mexican Congress representing Michoacán as replacement of Netzahualcóyotl de la Vega and as Deputy of the LVI Legislature.

References

1961 births
Living people
People from Morelia
Politicians from Michoacán
Women members of the Senate of the Republic (Mexico)
Members of the Senate of the Republic (Mexico)
Members of the Chamber of Deputies (Mexico)
Institutional Revolutionary Party politicians
Women members of the Chamber of Deputies (Mexico)
20th-century Mexican politicians
20th-century Mexican women politicians
21st-century Mexican politicians
21st-century Mexican women politicians